The Puget Sound Regional Fire Authority, operating as Puget Sound Fire provides fire protection and emergency medical services to communities south of Seattle and east of Puget Sound in King County, Washington. The department is responsible for services in the communities of Covington, Kent, Maple Valley, SeaTac and the unincorporated King County Fire Districts #37 and #43.

History 
Originally founded in 1892 as the Kent Fire Department, Puget Sound Fire has grown to serve new communities throughout its history. The department was rebranded as the Puget Sound Regional Fire Authority from the Kent Regional Fire Authority on January 1, 2017.

In 2018 the department responded to 26,636 service calls of which 20,489 were for EMS services.

Stations and apparatus 
, Puget Sound Fire had 13 stations located throughout the district. In addition to housing firefighters, Station 74 is also home to the headquarters and administrative offices of the department. Stations 75 and 76 are also home to King County Medic units operated by the county and not the department.

References 

Fire departments in Washington (state)
Government of King County, Washington
Seattle metropolitan area
1892 establishments in Washington (state)